Sikandar Ka Mandar is an indie folk rock band from Karachi. Since its formation in 2010, the band members have been increasingly involved in the local indie music industry in Pakistan. They released their debut, self-titled album in 2013 and have since performed on multiple occasions across the country at festivals such as the Lahore Music Meet, Storm in a Teacup, I Am Karachi, and FACE Music Mela.

The official band line-up as of 2019 is:
 Nadir Shahzad Khan (Main Vocals)
 Ali Suhail (Backing Vocals, Lead guitar, Bass Guitar, Production)
 Zahra Paracha (Backing Vocals, Rhythm guitar, Synth, Mandolin)
 Daud Ramay (Drums)

Discography

Sikandar Ka Mandar (2013)  

 Badshah
 Jo Bhi
 Main Idhar Khara Hoon
 Doosray Log
 Doosri Duniya
 Hum Tum Yeh Woh
 Bhai Jan
 Bemisal

36 (Chhatees) (2017)  
 Gehri Neend
 Baaghi (ft. Natasha Humera Ejaz)
 36
 Shehri
 Himmat (ft. Faizan Reidinger)
 Tu Fikr Na Kar (ft. Nasir Siddiqui)
 Uncle (ft. Daud Ramay)
 Sayasatdan
 Bolo (ft. Natasha Noorani)
 Cassette Kahani

Singles 

 Hilm (2013) 
 Track for a film (2016) 
 Bolo (OST Chalay Thay Saath) (2016) 
Chand Si Banu (ft. Jajji Jee) (2020)

See also 
 List of Pakistani music bands

References

External links 
 Facebook.com/Sikandarkamandar
 Youtube.com/c/Sikandarkamandar

Pakistani musical groups
Indie folk groups
Folk rock groups
Musical groups established in 2010
2010 establishments in Pakistan